The Becerra Formation is a geologic formation in Mexico. It preserves fossils.

See also

 List of fossiliferous stratigraphic units in Mexico

References
 

Geology of Mexico